The School of Politics and International Relations is an academic department at the University of Nottingham, England housed in the Law and Social Sciences Building (LASS) together with Law and Sociology.

The school runs nine undergraduate programmes, nine postgraduate programmes and have a 40-strong PhD community. Research activity in the school is ranked around 7 Institutes.

 the head of school is Associate Professor Caitlin Milazzo.

In 2013 the department was chosen along with the University of Oxford and the University of Manchester to host the 2015 British Election Study. In the 2008 Research Assessment Exercise the Department's research was ranked in the top 10 departments of Politics in the country and 85% of the research was considered of international standard. The department ranks 12th in The Guardian's 2013 league table of Politics departments. The Complete University Guide ranked Nottingham 10th for Politics in 2013 and 13th for Politics in 2014.

History
The School of Politics and International Relations at Nottingham was established in 1965 and was initially housed in the old Engineering Building. Richard Pear was the first Professor of Politics. Politics had previously been taught as early as 1959 as part of the Department of Social Science where Politics formed part of a joint degree in Politics and Economics.

In 1971 the Sir Francis Hill chair was established following an endowment from the Municipal Mutual Insurance Company and Frank Stacey, an expert in local government was appointed. In 1981 Dennis Kavanagh joined the school. Kavanagh is best known for his work on the Nuffield Election Studies. The School moved to the 'Orchards' Building during the 1980s. Several new degrees were introduced during the 1980s including an MA in Political Economy and Political Culture and a joint BA in Politics and History and an MA in International Relations.

In 1994 the head of department Dr David Regan committed suicide by carbon monoxide poisoning and cited his treatment by the University of Nottingham in a suicide note. In 1999 moved to the Law and Social Sciences Building (LASS) and changed its name to the ‘School of Politics and International Relations' in 2005.
In 2011 the school gained national media attention following the arrest of two student one of whom was completing a PhD related to terrorism.  Dr Rod Thornton published a paper critical of the department's handling of the incident and was subsequently suspended. Thornton later left by "mutual consent".

Research
The current research centres are:
The Centre for Normative Political Theory
Centre for Conflict, Security and Terrorism
Centre for the Study of European Governance
Centre for the Study of Social and Global Justice
Centre for British Politics
Institute for Asia-Pacific Studies
Methods and Data Institute

Notable staff
Paul Heywood – expert on corruption.
Michael Freeden – Author of Ideologies and Political Theory a landmark study on political ideology
Steven Fielding – political historian
Richard J. Aldrich

Honorary Professors
The school appoints a number of Honorary Professors who share their real world expertise with students. For instance former Member of Parliament Jacqui Smith has given a number of talks to students studying British Politics and the British Parliament.  they were:

Major-General Tim Cross CBE
Ion Trewin
Colin Jennings
Sir Jeremy Greenstock
Ted Cantle
Sir Sherard Cowper-Coles
Jacqui Smith
Carolyn Quinn
Michael Cockerell
Paul Collins

Controversies

David Regan
In 1994 the then head of the department David Regan killed himself in a protest against decisions made by management at the University of Nottingham which he disagreed with. The University rejected calls for a public inquiry into the death.

Nottingham Two

The School received international media attention in 2011 when an academic in the department Rod Thornton published an academic paper critical of the department and the University of Nottingham's handling of the arrest of a student called Rizwaan Sabir who was completing a PhD thesis on terrorism. Mr Sabir downloaded a copy of an Al-Qaeda training manual from a US government website and was wrongly arrested on terrorism charges. The University of Nottingham described the paper as defamatory to a number of Thornton's colleagues in the department. Thornton later apologised for inaccuracies in his paper and left his job by mutual consent.

Miwa Hirono visa controversy
In 2015 Times Higher Education reported that the Home Office had refused a visa for the academic Miwa Hirono, an expert on Chinese foreign policy, on the basis she had spent around 200 days in the past five years resident in China researching China's foreign peacekeeping and humanitarian operations. Matthew Humphrey, head of Nottingham's School of Politics and International Relations said that the policy was "vindictive and bone-headed".

Journals
The Department currently hosts four leading politics journals.

Government and Opposition [Impact factor: 0.8 (2012)]
Parliamentary Affairs [Impact factor: 1.238 (2008)]
Political Studies [Impact factor: 0.400 (2012)]
Political Studies Review

Alumni

Emma Barnett – broadcaster and journalist, former Women's editor of The Daily Telegraph
Natalie Pinkham – TV presenter
Kelvin Hopkins – Labour MP for Luton North
Tom Copley- London Assembly Member. Spokesman for Housing
Jeremy Browne – former Liberal Democrat Member of Parliament.
Michael Dugher – former Labour Member of Parliament for Barnsley East.

References

External links
Official website

Organizations established in 1965
Political science education
Schools of international relations
University departments in England
University of Nottingham
1965 establishments in England